Palaeolimosina is a genus of flies belonging to the family lesser dung flies.

Species
Palaeolimosina nigrina (Duda, 1920) Bolivia

References

Sphaeroceridae
Diptera of South America
Taxa named by Oswald Duda
Sphaeroceroidea genera